TEAM2 cluster is a French business cluster for environmental technologies and circular economy. It is located in Northern France in Urban Community of Lille Métropole and at Loos-en-Gohelle. It is supported by Université Lille Nord de France, Veolia Environnement, Suez Environnement and 200 SMEs.

Bibliography 
Marie-France Barthet, Les pôles de compétitivité, La Documentation française, 2009, 128 p.

See also 
Université Lille Nord de France 
 Unité de catalyse et de chimie du solide de Lille

External links 
TEAM2 web site

High-technology business districts in France
University of Lille Nord de France